The Battle of San Felasco Hammock was  a battle of the Second Seminole War fought by Florida's Seminole Indians to prevent their removal to the Arkansas Territory in accordance with the Indian Removal Act of 1830. Euro-American settlers established the town of Newnansville, Florida, around Fort Gilleland. The site upon which both Fort Gilleland and Newnansville once stood is now encompassed by the city of Alachua, Florida. The San Felasco Hammock is currently part of San Felasco Hammock Preserve State Park.

Battle

Colonel Warren's report
At one o'clock this morning, four men of tried valor were sent out to reconnoiter around the San Felasco Hammock and the plantation of Colonel Sanchez; they returned at four o'clock, having made no discovery. Being satisfied that they were there, I resolved to go out; accordingly, at six o'clock I marched out with one hundred mounted men, being detachments from Captains Walker, Ward, and Garrison's companies, with twenty-five gentlemen under Captain Beekman, (having formerly belonged to his company, and volunteered their services for this special service,) Captain D. D. Tompkins, of company B, 1st regiment United States artillery, with a twenty-four-pound howitzer and twenty five of his men. This command was arranged in three lines, as follows: Captain Walker, with his company, and Lieutenant Bruten, in command of the detachment from Captain Garrison's company, formed the right wing under my personal command ; Captain Tompkins, with his command, formed the centre; and the volunteers under Captain Beekman, with Captain Ward's company, formed the left wing under Lieutenant Colonel Mills. On arriving within three-quarters of a mile of the hammock, the spies reported Indians in front; they immediately opened a sharp fire on the right wing and center.

The Indians on the left, in considerable force, made an attempt to turn that flank, but were charged with spirit and success by Lieutenant Colonel Mills's command, and driven into a thick-wooded oak scrub; then, dismounting and charging on them, drove them through this into the border of the hammock, where the artillery played on them with considerable effect. After this, they retired to the right, and attempted to turn, that wing; but were charged with success by Captain Walker and Lieutenant Bruten's command, and again driven within range of the artillery, which opened on them with great effect. They made several desperate attempts to maintain their position, and charged twice on the artillery, but were driven off at all points, and pursued for a mile and a half into a dense hammock, where they could not be pursued to advantage.

1836 in the United States
San Felasco Hammock
San Felasco Hammock
1836 in Florida Territory
September 1836 events